Antinoeis was a deme of ancient Attica, in the part of the city founded by the emperor Hadrian. The deme was established only in 126 or 127, after the death of Antinous, a favourite of Hadrian.

The site of Antinoeis is unlocated.

References

Populated places in ancient Attica
Former populated places in Greece
Demoi
Lost ancient cities and towns
120s establishments in the Roman Empire